Dargahan (also Romanized as Dargahān and Dargawān; also known as Bandar-e Dargahān) is a coastal city in the Central District of Qeshm County, Hormozgan Province, Iran.

References 

Cities in Hormozgan Province
Populated places in Qeshm County
Populated coastal places in Iran
Port cities and towns in Iran
Port cities and towns of the Persian Gulf